The Dabri Mor - Janakpuri South metro station is a station on the Magenta Line of the Delhi Metro. This represents part of the third phase of development of the Delhi Metro It was opened to the public on 29 May 2018.

The station

Station layout

Entry/exit

Connections

Bus
Delhi Transport Corporation bus routes number 0OMS (-), 0740, 740, 740EXT, 741, 753, 761, 813, 833A, 879, 893, OMS (-), Uttam Nagar Terminal – Gurugram Bus Stand, serves the station from nearby C-2D Janakpuri bus stop.

See also

Delhi
Janakpuri
Dashrath puri
List of Delhi Metro stations
Transport in Delhi
Delhi Metro Rail Corporation
Delhi Suburban Railway
Delhi Monorail
Indira Gandhi International Airport
Delhi Transport Corporation
South West Delhi
National Capital Region (India)
List of rapid transit systems
List of metro systems

References

External links

 Delhi Metro Rail Corporation Ltd. (Official site)
 Delhi Metro Annual Reports
 

Delhi Metro stations
Railway stations in West Delhi district
Railway stations in India opened in 2018
2018 establishments in Delhi